Roland "Bo" Farley (March 25, 1907 – April 1, 1999) was an American football, basketball, and baseball coach.  He was the head football, basketball and baseball coach of the East Carolina Pirates at the East Carolina Teachers College, now known as East Carolina University. Farley was the head football coach from 1936, as well as the head basketball coach at East Carolina for two seasons, 1936–37 and 1939–40, and the school's head baseball coach for five seasons, from 1935 to 1938 and again in 1940.

Head coaching record

Football

References

1907 births
1999 deaths
Basketball coaches from Virginia
East Carolina Pirates baseball coaches
East Carolina Pirates football coaches
East Carolina Pirates men's basketball coaches
Sportspeople from Danville, Virginia
Greenville Greenies players